A Temporary Truce is a 1912 American short silent Western film directed by D. W. Griffith and starring Blanche Sweet. A print of the film survives in the film archive of the Library of Congress.

Plot
Mexican Jim, the villain, kidnaps Alice, wife of Jack the prospector.  Jack declares a temporary truce with Jim so they can both battle the Indians as a common enemy.

Cast

Themes
D. W. Griffith did not always portray Mexican characters in a negative light; however, in this film they are portrayed as a threat to white families and women. The film is more complex in this regard that previous Griffith work.

Production
The cast was considered to be quite large for a short film under two reels. This is one of three D. W. Griffith films that Bert Hendler appeared in. The cast also included Mae Marsh, who worked with Griffith on many films, including The Birth of a Nation.  She was one of his favorites and in a 1923 interview, Griffith noted that "Mae Marsh was born a film star."

See also
 D. W. Griffith filmography
 Blanche Sweet filmography

References

External links
 

1912 films
1912 Western (genre) films
1912 short films
American silent short films
American black-and-white films
Films directed by D. W. Griffith
Silent American Western (genre) films
1910s American films
1910s English-language films